The Hutchinson Encyclopedia is an English-language general encyclopedia. It is a single volume designed for use in the home, libraries and schools. It attempts to be readable by reducing the use of technical language. A small subset of the Encyclopaedia is available for free but full access requires a subscription.

Edition history
First edition (as ) 1948
Second edition 1951
Third edition 1956
Fourth edition (as Hutchinson's new 20th Century Encyclopedia) 1964
Fifth edition 1970
Sixth edition (as The new Hutchinson 20th Century Encyclopedia) 1977
Seventh edition 1981
Eighth edition (as The Hutchinson Encyclopedia) 1988 - with 25,000 articles and 2,350 illustrations.
Ninth edition 1990
Tenth edition 1994
Eleventh edition 1997

There have also been editions in 2000

There are several other editions about specific subjects

See also
List of online encyclopedias

References

English-language encyclopedias
British online encyclopedias
Publications established in 1948
20th-century encyclopedias